Black Rat is the second studio album by Australian Dance-punk band DZ Deathrays. It was released by I Oh You Records in Australia and by Dine Alone Records in Canada on 2 May 2014. It was produced by former-Gerling frontman Burke Reid and recorded at the Grove Studios in Somersby from December 2013 to January 2014. It won at the ARIA Music Awards of 2014 for Best Hard Rock/Heavy Metal Album.

Writing and recording
Most songs were written by both Shane Parsons and  Simon Ridley. Writing began in early 2013 when the duo were together in the remote town of Yass, New South Wales. Once the two were happy with what they had, sometime after leaving Yass, they entered the Grove Studio with producer Burke Reid and over the course of six weeks they produced the album.

Critical reception

The album met with generally favourable reviews. On Metacritic, which assigns a normalised rating out of 100 to reviews from critics, the album has an average score of 77 based on 6 reviews. In early May 2014, writing for the Australian newspaper, music journalist Andrew McMillen awarded Black Rat 3.5 stars out of a possible 5. McMillen compared their debut album Bloodstreams as juvenile alongside Black Rat, and writes that the more mature sound better suits the duo, as they move beyond their "trash party" origins. McMillen further praises the album's 11 songs as a "significant step forward" and concludes: "... it's [Black Rat] the sound of a confident band torn between its populist, party-friendly beginnings and a new-found ability to embrace glimpses of beauty amid the sonic destruction." On 18 May, the album peaked at No. 23 on the ARIA Charts for one week.

Track listing
Track listing adapted from AllMusic.

Personnel

DZ Deathrays
 Shane Parsons – lead vocals, guitars
 Simon Ridley – drums, percussion

Production
Burke Reid – producer
Simon Ridley – programming

Charts

References

2014 albums
DZ Deathrays albums
Dine Alone Records albums
Albums produced by Burke Reid
ARIA Award-winning albums